SV Oberachern is a German association football club from the town of Achern, Baden-Württemberg. The club plays in the Oberliga Baden-Württemberg, in the fifth tier of the German football league system.

History
Formed in 1928 the club has long been a local amateur side, rising as far as the Landesliga on occasion. It experienced a measure of success in 1996 when it reached the final of the South Baden Cup but lost to FV Donaueschingen.

The club's rise began in the early 2000s, winning promotion to the Bezirksliga from the Kreisliga in 2004. It earned promotion to the tier six Landesliga Südbaden 1 after a title in the Bezirksliga Baden-Baden in 2005.

In the Verbandsliga Südbaden from 2009 onwards, SVO improved season by season, finishing ninth in 2010, fourth in 2011 and runners-up in 2012. The latter allowed the club participation in the promotion round to the Oberliga but it lost to TSG Weinheim on aggregate in the first round. The club had a better 2012–13 season, winning the Verbandsliga and earning direct promotion to the Oberliga Baden-Württemberg. In this league SVO came last in 2013–14 and was relegated back to the Verbandsliga Südbaden. In 2015 it won the league for the second time and another promotion back to the Oberliga.

Honours
The club's honours:

League
 Verbandsliga Südbaden
 Champions: 2013, 2015
 Runners-up: 2012
 Bezirksliga Baden-Baden
 Champions: 2005
 Kreisliga A Süd
 Champions: 2004

Cup
 South Baden Cup
 Champions: 2022
 Runners-up: 1996, 2016, 2020

Recent seasons
The recent season-by-season performance of the club:

 With the introduction of the Regionalligas in 1994 and the 3. Liga in 2008 as the new third tier, below the 2. Bundesliga, all leagues below dropped one tier.

References

External links
Official team site
Das deutsche Fußball-Archiv historical German domestic league tables 
SV Oberachern at Weltfussball.de

Football clubs in Germany
Football clubs in Baden-Württemberg
Association football clubs established in 1928
1928 establishments in Germany